Hashid Abdullah al-Ahmar is a Yemeni politician. He quit his position as Deputy Minister of Youth and Sports over the 2011 Yemeni uprising.

References

Yemeni politicians
General People's Congress (Yemen) politicians
Living people
Year of birth missing (living people)

People from Amran Governorate